Pechey may refer to:

Places
 Pechey, Queensland, Australia
 Pechey Forestry Arboretum, an arboretum in Pechey

Surname
 Alfred Pechey (1840–1882), Australian politician
 Archibald Thomas Pechey (1876-1961), English writer
 Edith Pechey (1845–1908), pioneer English physician and suffragist
 Edward Wilmot Pechey (1841–1904), Australian politician
 Phyllis Nan Sortain Pechey or Fanny Cradock (1909–1994), English TV presenter and writer